Santeri Lukka (born 19 July 1991) is a Finnish former professional ice hockey player. He now coaches defencemen in Ässät's junior teams.

References

1991 births
Living people
Ässät players
Finnish ice hockey defencemen
HC TPS players
KalPa players
Sportspeople from Pori